Daganbhuiyan is a town and paurashava (municipality) in Feni district of Chittagong Division, Bangladesh. The town is the headquarter and urban centre of Daganbhuiyan Upazila.

References

Populated places in Feni District